Natural Mystic may refer to:
"Natural Mystic" (song), a song by Jamaican reggae group Bob Marley and the Wailers
Natural Mystic: The Legend Lives On, a compilation album by Bob Marley & The Wailers